The Income Tax Service, Group 'B' (Hindi: आयकर सेवा, ग्रुप 'बी') is the revenue service of the Government of India. It is the feeder service of the premier and elite Indian Revenue Service. The service functions under the Department of Revenue in the Union Ministry of Finance and is concerned with the collection and administration of the various direct  accruing to the Union Government. 

All officers of and up to the rank of Income Tax Officer belong to Group B (Income Tax officer (ITO) is gazetted while those below the rank of Income Tax Officer are non-gazetted). On reaching the rank of Assistant Commissioner they are accorded IRS (Group A) by the President of India.

Ranks of the ITS

See also 

 List of Income Tax Department officer ranks
 Civil Services of India
 All India Services
 Corruption in India

References

External links
 Official Website of Income Tax Department of India
 Official Website of Indian Revenue Service
 Training Academy for Members of Indian Revenue Service - Income Tax
 

Central Civil Services (India)
Income Tax Department of India